= 1987 Liechtenstein double yes referendum =

- 13 September 1987
- Referendum on the "double yes" for referendums

Results
Choice	Votes	%
Yes	4,181	62.95%
No	2,461	37.05%
Valid votes	6,642	95.09%
Invalid or blank votes	343	4.91%
Total votes	6,985	100.00%
Registered voters/turnout	12,923	54.05%

A referendum on the "double yes" for referendums was held in Liechtenstein on 13 September 1987. The proposal would mean that during referendums on draft legislation, voters would have the option of rejecting all proposals (an initiative, counter-initiative and a proposal by the Landtag), agreeing with one proposal, or agreeing to several. If voters were to agree with several, they had to rank them in case more than one was approved by voters. It was approved by 62.9% of voters.

== Results ==
Choice	Votes	%
For	4,181	62.9
Against	2,461	37.1
Invalid/blank votes	343	–
Total	6,985	100
Registered voters/turnout	12,923	54.1
Source: Nohlen & Stöver
